James Craven may refer to:

 James Braxton Craven Jr. (1918–1977), United States federal judge
 James Brown Craven (1850–1924), author of works on ecclesiastical history
 James Craven (British actor) in Wings Over Africa
 James Craven (American actor) (1892–1955), American actor
 James Craven (rugby league), rugby league player for the Batley Bulldogs
 James J. Craven, Jr., member of the Massachusetts House of Representatives
 James Craven (1850–1920), mayor of Preston 1903–04